Marco Dubois (born June 5, 1995) is a professional Canadian football wide receiver for the Ottawa Redblacks of the Canadian Football League (CFL).

University career
Dubois played U Sports football for the Laval Rouge et Or from 2014 to 2017.

Professional career
Dubois was drafted by the Ottawa Redblacks in the second round with the 13th overall pick in the 2018 CFL Draft and signed with the team on May 16, 2018. He made the active roster following training camp and played in his first professional game on June 21, 2018, against the Saskatchewan Roughriders. He later made his first career catch on August 31, 2018 against the Montreal Alouettes. In total, he played in 17 regular season games and recorded three receptions for 11 yards. He also played in both postseason games that year and scored his first touchdown on an 11-yard pass from Trevor Harris in the East Final on November 18, 2018. He also played in his first Grey Cup game that year, but the Redblacks lost to the Calgary Stampeders in the 2018 championship.

In 2019, Dubois played in all 18 regular season games and had four catches for 34 yards. He did not play in 2020 due to the cancellation of the 2020 CFL season and instead re-signed with the Redblacks to a one-year extension on December 17, 2020.

References

External links

Ottawa Redblacks bio

1995 births
Living people
Canadian football wide receivers
Laval Rouge et Or football players
Ottawa Redblacks players
People from LaSalle, Quebec
Players of Canadian football from Quebec
Canadian football people from Montreal
Canadian football fullbacks